Frank B. Cooper Elementary School, usually called Cooper School, serves students from kindergarten through 5th grade. Located in the Pigeon Point neighborhood of Delridge, Seattle, Washington, it is part of the Seattle Public Schools district. The school's  site is immediately adjacent to the  West Duwamish Greenbelt, one of Seattle's largest wildlife habitat corridors. This rich natural environment enhances the school's environmental education program.

While the current building, located at 1901 SW Genesee Street, was opened in 1999, Cooper School enjoys a long history in the community, dating back to 1906, when a group of 70 students, children of steel mill workers, attended classes at Youngstown School in a small building offered by the Seattle Steel Company. A year later, a wooden building—known as Riverside School—was built for the school at the base of Pigeon Hill. As the population of the community grew, the wooden structure was replaced by a brick building 1917, which was designed by Edgar Blair, with a 1929 expansion designed by Floyd Naramore. In 1939, the school was renamed to honor Frank B. Cooper, a former Seattle school superintendent. The historic Youngstown School building, located at 4408 Delridge Way SW, now houses the Cooper Artist Housing and Youngstown Cultural Arts Center. It is listed in the National Register of Historic Places.

One of the school's assets is its diversity. Approximately 80 percent of Cooper students are racial or ethnic minorities and approximately one-quarter are bilingual.

The first African American teacher hired to teach in Seattle Public Schools, Thelma Dewitty, worked at Cooper School from 1947 until 1953. The Thelma DeWitty Theater at the Youngstown Cultural Arts Center is named after her.

On Thursday January 29, 2009 the Seattle School Board voted to close Cooper Elementary School and move the Pathfinder K-8 program to the Cooper campus.

Notes

Further reading
 Karen Gordon (City Historic Preservation Officer), Report on Designation of the Cooper Elementary School as a Seattle landmark, August 27, 2002.

External links 
History of Delridge and Cooper Elementary School
Cooper Elementary School
HistoryLink.org essay on Thelma Dewitty
Preservation Seattle article on the original Cooper School building

Landmarks in Seattle
Public elementary schools in Washington (state)
National Register of Historic Places in Seattle
Seattle Public Schools
1910s architecture in the United States
School buildings on the National Register of Historic Places in Washington (state)